Chaab may refer to:
 Chaab, Sistan and Baluchestan